David Adley Smith II (born May 2, 1992) is a Puerto Rican track and field athlete who competes in the high jump event. He competed at the 2016 Summer Olympics.  In late 2017, Smith won a $2 million lawsuit for a car accident which resulted in a hip injury and his being unable to compete as well as he had in the past.

References

1992 births
Living people
Puerto Rican male high jumpers
Athletes (track and field) at the 2016 Summer Olympics
Olympic track and field athletes of Puerto Rico